Pierre-François Levasseur, called "the older" (11 March 1753 – 23 December 1815) was a French classical cellist.

Biography 
Born in Abbeville, Levasseur was initially destined for the priesthood, Levasseur studied to enter the orders. At eighteen he renounced the ecclesiastical state to become a musician. For three months he received lessons from an obscure master named Belleval, and then studied the cello alone.

Arriving in Paris around 1782, he received a few lessons Duport the older, of whom he imitated the manner and acquired the fine quality of sound. In 1789 he played concertos by Duport the younger at the concert spirituel. Later heperformed in the orchestra of the Théâtre Feydeau. He entered the opera orchestra in 1785 and obtained his retirement pension in 1815 after thirty years of service and at the age of sixty-eight. He died soon after.

References

Compositions 
 Six duos pour deux violoncelles, op. I, Paris, Leduc
 Six duos pour deux violoncelles, second book; Paris, Leduc

Sources 
 François-Joseph Fétis, Arthur Pougin, Biographie universelle des musiciens et bibliographie générale de la musique, Paris, Firmin-Didot, vol.5, 1881, (pp. 289–90).

External links 
  Pierre-François Levasseur in Sonatas for violoncello and basso, Volume 49

French classical composers
French male classical composers
French classical cellists
1753 births
19th-century deaths
Year of death missing
People from Abbeville
1815 deaths